Babafemi Badejo is a Nigerian academic, writer and diplomat.

Early life and education 
Badejo was born on  4 March 1955, in Ijebu Ode He attended Saint Saviours Primary School, Italowajoda, Ijebu Ode and Baptist Primary School, Ereko, Ijebu Ode. He finished at Ijebu Ode Grammar School, Ijebu Ode before proceeding to the University of Lagos in 1973 for his first degree in political science. He completed his Ph.D. in political science at the University of California, Los Angeles, (UCLA), US in 1982 and later LL.B., Bachelor of Law, University of Lagos, Nigeria. January 1990. He was called to the Nigerian Bar as a solicitor and advocate of the Supreme Court of Nigeria on 12 December 1990.

Career 
Badejo married Adejumoke Odusanya on 9 September 1977, and they have three daughters, a son and grandchildren. They jointly set up Yintab Private Academy, providing education from Crèche to Senior Secondary School. Prof. Badejo's interest in the game of Chess, led to the sponsorship of the Femi Badejo National Chess Tournament in 2002, by the Femi Badejo Foundation in conjunction with the Nigeria Chess Federation (NCF)

On 2 October 1991, the Minister of External Affairs of the Federal Republic of Nigeria approved his participation in the 46th Session of the UN General Assembly as Special Assistant to former President Olusegun Obasanjo on his bid for the position of the UN Secretary General.

He formally left his academic career at the University of Lagos in 1996 for a career in peace operations at the United Nations, from where he retired on 31 March 2017. He served in many conflict areas, including Somalia, Liberia, Guinea-Bissau and Darfur Sudan. During part of an 11 years stay in Nairobi, Kenya at the UN Political Office for Somalia which Mission was overseeing the conflict in Somalia, he was appointed Deputy Special Representative of the UN Secretary-General, (DSRSG) for Somalia

Upon his retirement from the UN, he founded and headed Yintab Strategy Consults (YSC) in April 2017. In this capacity, he has played a key role for the African Union (AU). African Union) and the Addis Ababa branch of the United Nations Development Program (UNECA).

Babafemi A. Badejo became a professor at Chrisland University, Abeokuta, Nigeria, beginning 11 March 2021. Badejo wrote a number of books in addition to two books on Kenya (Raila Odinga: An Enigma in Kenyan Politics, 2006) and Nigeria (Rethinking Security Initiatives in Nigeria, 2020).

References 

1955 births
Living people
Nigerian officials of the United Nations
University of California, Los Angeles alumni
Politicians from Ogun State
University of Lagos alumni
Academic staff of the University of Lagos
20th-century Nigerian lawyers
21st-century Nigerian writers
Nigerian male writers
Nigerian diplomats
Nigerian non-fiction writers